Alan Niven (4 July 1955 – 5 March 1999) was an Australian international footballer who played as a defender.

Niven was born in England and played youth football for Wolverhampton Wanderers. After representing Nuneaton Borough, he moved to Australia, where he made over 250 appearances for Brisbane Lions in the National Soccer League.

He made eight appearances for the Australian national team.

Early life
Niven was born in England.

Club career
Niven played youth football for Wolverhampton Wanderers.

In 1975, Niven made three appearances for Nuneaton Borough – one in the Southern League Premier Division and two in the Midland Floodlit Cup.

From 1977 to 1988, Niven represented Brisbane Lions in the Australian National Soccer League, making 252 appearances and scoring 11 goals.

International career
Niven made his international debut for Australia in 1981 against Fiji. He went on to make eight 'A' international appearances for the side.

Style of play
Niven played as a defender.

Gerry O'Hara, who played with Niven at Wolverhampton, described Niven as a left back with a similar playing style to Scott Golbourne.

After football
Niven went on to work for the Queensland Government at the Queensland Water Resources Commission and the Department of Natural Resources.

Death
Niven died on 5 March 1999, aged 43, after suffering a heart attack while playing soccer.

Career statistics

Club

International

Honours

International
Merlion Cup: 1982

See also
List of Australia international soccer players born outside Australia

References

External links
 Alan Niven at OzFootball

1955 births
1999 deaths
English footballers
Australian soccer players
Association football defenders
Nuneaton Borough F.C. players
Queensland Lions FC players
National Soccer League (Australia) players
Southern Football League players
Australia international soccer players
English emigrants to Australia